Euriphene minkoi is a butterfly in the family Nymphalidae. It is found in Gabon and Cameroon.

Subspecies
Euriphene minkoi minkoi (Gabon)
Euriphene minkoi collinsi Hecq, 1994 (Cameroon)

References

Butterflies described in 1993
Euriphene